Vasanthabalan (sometimes credited as Vasantha Balan) is an Indian Tamil film director and screenwriter, known for his Tragedy Films in Tamil Cinema. He has made critically acclaimed films including Veyil (2006), Angadi Theru (2010) and Kaaviya Thalaivan (2014).

Career
Vasanthabalan began his film career as an editing assistant and later became an assistant director to S.Shankar in the latter's directorial debut, Gentleman (1993). He continued to work under Shankar in three more filmsKaadhalan (1994), Indian (1996) and Jeans (1998)and first attempted to make a film titled Aathi with Rajasekar in the lead role, but the project was stalled. He later made his break as an independent director with the box-office failure Album (2002).

His second film, produced by Shankar's S Pictures, Veyil (2006) was both critically acclaimed and commercially successful. It was shown as the Indian representative at the 2007 Cannes Film Festival. His next release, Angadi Theru (2010), showcased a romantic tale set in the famous Ranganathan Street in the city of Chennai, Tamil Nadu. The film won critical acclaim and was a commercial success as well. It was shortlisted for India's submission for the Academy Award for Best Foreign Language Film. In 2012, he released Aravaan, a period film based on the novel Kaaval Kottam that reflects the life of people of South Tamil Nadu in the 18th century. Following that, he made the period drama Kaaviya Thalaivan (2014), which won critical acclaim.

Filmography

References

External links
 

Tamil film directors
Living people
Film directors from Tamil Nadu
People from Virudhunagar district
Filmfare Awards South winners
21st-century Indian film directors
Year of birth missing (living people)